John Fulboam Brebbia (born May 30, 1990) is an American professional baseball pitcher for the San Francisco Giants of Major League Baseball (MLB). He played college baseball for Elon University. The New York Yankees selected Brebbia in the 30th round of the 2011 MLB draft. He made his MLB debut for the St. Louis Cardinals in 2017, and pitched for them through 2019. He had Tommy John surgery in 2020.

Early life and amateur career

Brebbia grew up in Sharon, Massachusetts, and attended Sharon High School through his junior year.  He transferred to Wellington High School in Wellington, Florida, for his senior year to improve his chances of earning a college baseball scholarship. As a senior at Wellington, he had a 10–1 win–loss record with a 0.83 earned run average (ERA), and recorded an 18-strikeout game.

After graduating from Wellington, Brebbia attended Elon University in Elon, North Carolina, where he was a pitcher for the Elon Phoenix baseball team. During his freshman year, Brebbia helped the Phoenix secure an at-large bid to the 2009 NCAA Division I baseball tournament. In 2011, his junior year, he went 7–1 with a 1.76 ERA in 27 relief appearances. He was named 2011 First Team All-Southern Conference. In 2010 and 2011, he played collegiate summer baseball for the Orleans Firebirds of the Cape Cod Baseball League.

Professional career

Early professional career
The New York Yankees selected Brebbia in the 30th round of the 2011 Major League Baseball draft, with the 929th pick. He signed and made his professional debut that same season with the Staten Island Yankees of the Class A-Short Season New York-Penn League, where he was 0–1 with a 0.00 ERA in eight innings.  He spent the 2012 season with the Charleston RiverDogs of the Class A South Atlantic League, and pitched to a 3–1 record with two saves and a 2.96 ERA in  innings over 29 relief appearances. He spent 2013 with Charleston and the Tampa Yankees of the Class A-Advanced Florida State League; he was a combined 0–5 with one save and a 4.06 ERA in  innings pitched in relief. He was released by the organization on December 13, 2013.

On January 7, 2014, Brebbia signed with the Sioux Falls Canaries of the American Association of Independent Professional Baseball. In 34 games with the Canaries, he pitched to a 3–2 record with one save and a 3.31 ERA, while striking out 10.5 batters/9 IP (5th-best in the league).  On December 22, 2014, Brebbia was traded to the Laredo Lemurs alongside AJ Kirby-Jones and Joe Testa in exchange for Byron Minnich, Harrison Kain, Jeremy Strawn, Josh Strawn, Tyler Pearson, Gerardo Avila, and cash considerations. In 2015 with Laredo, Brebbia logged a 7–2 record with a 0.98 ERA (second-best in the league), in 51 games (third-best), with 19 saves (third-best), an 0.762 WHIP (second-best), 4.8 hits/9 IP (second-best), and 11.1 strikeouts/9 IP (fourth-best).

On September 21, 2015, Brebbia signed a minor league contract with the Arizona Diamondbacks organization and was assigned to the Double-A Mobile BayBears.

St. Louis Cardinals
The St. Louis Cardinals selected Brebbia from the Diamondbacks in the minor league phase of the Rule 5 draft at the December 2015 Winter Meetings. In 2016, Brebbia played with both the Springfield Cardinals of the Class AA Texas League and Memphis Redbirds of the Class AAA Pacific Coast League. He was 5–5 with a 5.03 ERA and 68 strikeouts in 68 innings over 43 games.

Brebbia began the 2017 season with Memphis. There he was 1–1 with three saves, a 1.69 ERA and 29 strikeouts in  innings pitched  when the Cardinals promoted him to the major league on May 27, 2017. He made his major league debut against the Colorado Rockies on May 28 and remained with the Cardinals for the rest of the season.  He finished his 2017 rookie campaign with a 2.44 ERA, 11 walks and 51 strikeouts in  innings, and a 0.929 WHIP, leading all Major League rookie relief pitchers in ERA and WHIP.

He began 2018 with Memphis but was recalled to St. Louis and optioned back to Memphis multiple times during the season. For Memphis, he was 2–0 with two saves, a 4.61 ERA and 24 strikeouts in  innings. In 45 relief appearances for St. Louis, he was 3–3 with two saves and  a 3.20 ERA, striking out 60 batters in  innings pitched. On October 29, 2018, Brebbia was selected to the MLB All-Star team at the 2018 MLB Japan All-Star Series, pitching in three games in the series. 

Brebbia returned to St. Louis' bullpen for the 2019 season. Over 66 appearances during the regular season he went 3–4 with a 3.59 ERA, striking out 87 batters over  relief innings. 

After first trying platelet-rich injection (PRP) treatment for a torn ulnar collateral ligament in his right elbow  Brebbia underwent Tommy John surgery on June 1, 2020, causing him to miss the 2020 season. On December 2, Brebbia was nontendered by the Cardinals.  In his three seasons with the Cardinals, Brebbia had a 3.14 ERA, and 10.2 strikeouts/9 IP.

San Francisco Giants
On December 21, 2020, Brebbia signed a one-year, $800,000 contract with the San Francisco Giants. On February 17, 2021, Brebbia was placed on the 60-day injured list as he continued to recover from Tommy John surgery. He was activated off of the injured list on June 20, recovering from Tommy John surgery faster than the normal 13–15 month recovery timeframe.

In the 2021 regular season for the Giants, Brebbia was 0–1 with a 5.89 ERA. He pitched 18.1 innings over 18 games. For AAA Sacramento, he was 3–0 with a 2.93 ERA in 17 games (2 starts) in which he pitched 15.1 innings. On November 30, Brebbia signed a $838,000 contract with the Giants, avoiding salary arbitration.

In 2022 with the Giants, Brebbia was 6–2 with a 3.18 ERA in 68 innings, as he pitched in a league-leading 76 games (11 starts).

On January 13, 2023, Brebbia agreed to a one-year, $2.3 million contract with the Giants, avoiding salary arbitration.

Pitching style 
Brebbia throws a mid-90s fastball, an effective 80 mph slider, and occasionally a changeup.

Personal
Brebbia and his wife, Amanda, welcomed a son in June 2019.  They live in Smyrna, Georgia.

References

External links

1990 births
Living people
Baseball players from Massachusetts
Charleston RiverDogs players
Elon Phoenix baseball players
Laredo Lemurs players
Major League Baseball pitchers
Memphis Redbirds players
Orleans Firebirds players
People from Sharon, Massachusetts
San Francisco Giants players
Sioux Falls Canaries players
Springfield Cardinals players
St. Louis Cardinals players
Staten Island Yankees players
Tampa Yankees players
Mankato MoonDogs players